Haustlǫng (Old Norse: 'Autumn-long'; anglicized as Haustlöng) is a skaldic poem composed around the beginning of the 10th century by the Norwegian skald Þjóðólfr of Hvinir.

The poem has been preserved in the 13th-century Prose Edda by Snorri Sturluson, who quotes two groups of stanzas from it and some verses to illustrate technical features of skaldic diction. Snorri also who drew inspiration from Þjóðólfr to redact his own version of the myths told in Haustlöng.

The poem describes mythological scenes said by the skald to have been painted on a shield: Loki's betraying of Iðunn, the goddess who kept the Æsir eternally young - who was snatched from them by the jötunn Þjazi after he had assumed eagle form; and Thor's victorious combat against the strongest of the jötnar, Hrungnir.

Title 
The title of the poem, Haustlǫng, translated as 'Autumn-long', may refer to its period of composition or gestation by the skald, identified from a relatively early period with Þjóðólfr of Hvinir.

Text

Abduction of Iðunn 
The stanzas 1–13 of the poem depict the encounter of the Æsir (gods) Odin, Loki and Hœnir with the jötunn Þjazi in the form of an eagle.

As the three gods Odin, Loki and Hœnir are trying to cook an ox, the giant Þjazi, who has assumed eagle form, asks for a share of the meat. Loki strikes at him with a staff, but the weapon sticks to the eagle and to Loki's hand as the bird flies off. The eagle finally agrees to release Loki on condition that he deliver up to him the gods' "old-age cure", Iðunn.

Without Iðunn, tells the poet, "all Ingi-Freyr’s kin [the Æsir] became old and grey in their assembly; the powers were rather ugly in form". The gods then catch Loki and force him to get Iðunn back: "‘You shall be trapped, Loki,’ the angry one spoke thus, ‘unless by some scheme you bring back the renowned maid, enlarger of the fetters' [gods'] joy."  In the less cryptic form of the episode recounted in the Prose Edda, we are told that Loki then borrows Freyja's falcon skin cloak in order to fly to Jötunheimar in bird form. There the Jötnar direct a storm-wind against the transformed god to keep him out of their abode, but nonetheless Loki is able to fly off with Idunn clutched in his claws in the form of a nut. Þjazi  gives chase in eagle form but is burnt in a bonfire kindled by the Aesir just after Loki has cleared the battlements of Asgard and ducked down to hide at the foot of the wall.

Thor's duel with Hrungnir 
In the stanzas 14–20 of Haustlöng, Þjóðólfr depicts Thor's journey to the duel with the jötunn Hrungnir while the entire cosmos reacts. Then Hrungnir and Thor fight by hurling their weapons at each other (the jötunn's whetstone and Thor's hammer), and the poem alludes at the end to the removal of the piece of whetstone from Thor's head. In contrast to Snorri Sturluson's account, Þjóðólfr lays more emphasis upon Thor's journey to the battle, accompanied by noise and flames, while Snorri makes relatively little of it and also describes Hrungnir's journey. Thor's servant Þjálfi and Hrungnir's clay-made giant Mokkurkálfi are absent from Þjóðólfr’s version.

Other verses 
Two other verses of Haustlöng have survived for they are also cited in the 13th-century Prose Edda:

 "Middlingly free of deceit, he was a slow provider of service to the god. The helmet-capped educator [Odin] of the fetters declared there was something behind it."

 "The lady-wolf [Thiassi] flew noisily to meet the commanders of the crew [the Æsir] no short time ago in an old old-one’s form."

Two other verses attributed to Þjóðólfr by Snorri in the Prose Edda were instead redacted by the 9th-century skald Þorbjörn Hornklofi.

See also
 Ekphrasis

References

Bibliography

External links
 Haustlǫng Old Norse text. Den norsk-islandske skjaldedigtning by Finnur Jónsson 1912-1915 
 Þjóðólfr ór Hvini: Haustlöng Two editions of the Old Norse text
 Haustlǫng by Þjóðolfr hvinverski Old Norse text with Lithuanian and English translation

Skaldic poems
Works based on art